Wiffen is a surname. Notable people with the name include: 

 Benjamin Barron Wiffen (1794–1867), English Quaker businessman, bibliophile and biographer
 David Wiffen (born 1942), Canadian singer-songwriter
 Daya Wiffen (born 1983), Danish netball player
 Jeremiah Holmes Wiffen (1792–1836), English poet and writer, brother of Benjamin Barron Wiffen
 Joan Wiffen (1922–2009), New Zealand amateur paleontologist
 Valerie Wiffen (born 1943), British artist